Antti Dahlberg is a Finnish former Paralympic athlete. He represented Finland at the 1988 Summer Paralympics held in Seoul, South Korea and he won the bronze medal in the men's 10,000 m 4 event. He also competed at the Summer Paralympics in 1980, 1984 and 1992.

References

External links 
 

Living people
Year of birth missing (living people)
Place of birth missing (living people)
Paralympic athletes of Finland
Athletes (track and field) at the 1980 Summer Paralympics
Athletes (track and field) at the 1984 Summer Paralympics
Athletes (track and field) at the 1988 Summer Paralympics
Athletes (track and field) at the 1992 Summer Paralympics
Paralympic bronze medalists for Finland
Medalists at the 1988 Summer Paralympics
Paralympic medalists in athletics (track and field)
Finnish male long-distance runners
Finnish male wheelchair racers
20th-century Finnish people
21st-century Finnish people